Angelo L. Santabarbara (born September 14, 1972) is a Democratic member of the New York State Assembly representing the 111th New York State Assembly District, which comprises areas of Montgomery and Schenectady Counties.

Early life and career
Santabarbara is a first-generation Italian-American who is a lifelong resident of Schenectady County. He graduated from Schalmont High School in Rotterdam in 1990 and was later inducted into the Schalmont High School Alumni Wall of Distinction. He earned a Bachelor of Science degree from State University of New York at Albany and is a licensed Professional Engineer.

Santabarbara served in the United States Army Reserves for eight years with an honorable discharge in 1998, and has remained involved with local veterans organizations. He is the founder of the first AMVETS Post in his hometown of Rotterdam and served as Post Commander from 2012-2015. He worked as a Civil Engineer for more than 15 years before entering politics.

He also served as President of the Capital District Chapter of the New York State Society of Professional Engineers and on the Board of Directors for the Autism Society of the Greater Capital Region, Family and Child Service of Schenectady, and Cornell Cooperative Extension in Schenectady County.

Political career
Santabarbara was elected to the Schenectady County Legislature in 2007 and re-elected in 2011, where he represented District 4, which includes the Towns of Rotterdam, Princetown and Duanesburg. He served as Chairman of the Transportation Committee and Vice Chairman of the Veterans Committee.

Santabarbara unsuccessfully challenged two term incumbent George Amedore for the 105th District of the New York State Assembly in 2010. He held public office as a Schenectady County Legislator for 5 years.

Angelo Santabarbara defeated Thomas Quackenbush in 2012 and was elected to the New York State Assembly as the first Assemblyman to represent the newly created 111th District, including Montgomery, Schenectady and Albany Counties. In 2022 he was reelected to a 6th term and continues to serve in the New York State Assembly.

As a member of the New York State Assembly he serves as Chairman of the Sub-Committee on Autism Retention and as a member of the Agriculture, Energy, Governmental Employees, Mental Health, Racing & Wagering, Small Business and Veterans' Affairs Committees.

References

External links
New York Assembly member website

1974 births
Living people
County legislators in New York (state)
Democratic Party members of the New York State Assembly
Politicians from Schenectady, New York
United States Army reservists
University at Albany, SUNY alumni
People from Rotterdam, New York
21st-century American politicians
Military personnel from Schenectady, New York